Arvind Bellad (born 3 August 1969) is an Indian politician, who is a Member of Legislative Assembly of Karnataka, representing Hubli-Dharwad West constituency since May 2013. Bellad is a member of the Bharatiya Janata Party.

Early life and education
Born on 3 August 1969, Bellad is the son of veteran RSS leader and former MLA Chandrakant Bellad and Leelavathi Bellad. He is the youngest among five children, he graduated from KE Boards High School and Karnataka Science College Dharwad completed his engineering from SDM College of Engineering, Dharwad. He pursued  his PGDM in business management from INSEAD in France.

He is married to Smriti Bellad and has two children, Agastya and Pracchi.

Political career
Arvind Bellad entered politics in the year 2013. He contested from Hubli-Dharwad West constituency of Karnataka State Legislative Assembly from Bharatiya Janata Party (BJP) and won. He represented BJP in the state assembly twice from Dharwad district.

Some important activities of Bellad-
 Started LKG and UKG in government schools. He noticed the dip in school attendance of Govt run schools. After discussing with parents of the children he started preschool as a pilot project in one school. This experiment was successful which led him to extend this idea to 62 govt schools. There was a rise in the student intake due to this.
 Campaigned for setting up of an Indian Institute of Technology (IIT) at Dharwad along with some others. IIT has been set up at Dharwad due to these efforts.  
 Worked for developing and implementing clean energy in rural areas. Conducted the study, prepared a report and started implementing it.
 Created a mobile phone app to listen to grievance of the people of his constituency.

References

External links 
 Karnataka Legislative Assembly

1969 births
Living people
Bharatiya Janata Party politicians from Karnataka
Karnataka MLAs 2013–2018
Karnataka MLAs 2018–2023
INSEAD alumni